Mount Sir John Abbott is a  mountain located in the Premier Range of the Cariboo Mountains in the east-central interior of British Columbia, Canada. It is located at the south end of the west wall of Kiwa Glacier, the source of Kiwa Creek.

The name honours the second Prime Minister of Canada, Sir John Abbott, who died in 1893. It was one of the first mountains in the Premier Range to be named after a Prime Minister, receiving its designation on September 6, 1927. It was originally named Mount Kiwa.

References

External links
Canadian Mountain Encyclopedia listing for Mount Sir John Abbott

Sir John Abbott
Sir John Abbott
Cariboo Land District